Torato Umanuto ("Torah study is his job") is a special arrangement for the Israeli Haredi sector that allows young men enrolled in Haredi yeshiva academies to complete their studies before their conscription in the Israeli Defense Forces. Conscription is normally compulsory for each Israeli citizen from 18 years of age, except Israeli Arabs, and lasts three years for men and two for women.

Haredi Jews maintain that the Torah studying practice (or reciting), when practiced by great Torah scholars or their disciples, is crucial in defending the state of Israel and its people, similar to an additional "praying division" of the Israeli army. In practice, the Torato Umanuto arrangement provides a legal route whereby Haredi Rabbis and their disciples can either enroll for a shortened service period (4 months), or be exempted altogether from compulsory military service.  

The source of the phrase 
Torato Umanuto is taken from the Talmud:

Post-Israeli independent exemption 

Originally, along with the establishment of the state of Israel, the first Prime Minister of Israel, David Ben-Gurion, during the 1948 Arab–Israeli War, reached a special arrangement with the Haredi Judaism sector (then represented by Agudat Yisrael and Yitzhak-Meir Levin), in which a small part of senior Haredi Yeshiva disciples (400 men) would temporarily be exempted from military service for as long as their sole occupation was the study of the Torah (which Haredi Judaism devote and occupy themselves with, for most part of their time and day, as a religious commandment). The new legal status was then named Torato Umanuto. The original purpose was to reach a comprehensive accommodation (later called religious Status quo) between the secular community and the Haredi population who were then living under the British Mandate for Palestine, and to prevent an internal conflict within the Jewish population (the Yishuv) while Israel was pleading to the UN for a Jewish and Democratic State.

By contrast, Jewish Israelis who belong to the Religious Zionism sector serve in the military, often under the system of Hesder yeshivas, an idea developed by Rav Yehuda Amital which combines Torah study with military service.

Over the course of the years, while the Israeli population grew, the number of Haredi men eligible for exemption under the Torato Umanuto grew even faster from 800 men in 1968 to 41,450 in 2005 compared to 7 million for the entire population of Israel. In percentage terms, 2.4% of the soldiers enlisting to the army in 1974 were benefiting from Torato Umanuto compared to 9.2% in 1999, when it was projected that the number would reach 15% by the year 2012. The issue turned into a political debate  within Israeli society as to who should be obliged to risk his or her life serving in the Israeli army; many Jewish Israelis who are not Haredi, including those in the Religious Zionism sector, started to complain over the uneven burden of military service and risk of life. Beyond the three years of regular-compulsory service for men and two for women, men also serve as military reserve force, including military exercises on regular basis until they turn 50.

For many years the Torato Umanuto arrangement had the status of a regulation under the jurisdiction of the Ministry of Defense (Prime Minister David Ben-Gurion also had the Defense portfolio). In the 1990s the High Court of Justice of Israel ruled that the Defense minister had no authority to determine the extent of these exemptions. The Supreme Court postponed the application of the ruling to give the government time to resolve the matter.

Tal Law 

In accordance with the judicial ruling, Prime Minister Ehud Barak set up  the Tal committee in 1999. The Tal committee reported in April 2000, and its recommendations were approved by the Knesset (Israeli parliament) in July 2002; the new Tal Law, as it came to be known, was passed with 51 votes in favour and 41 against. The new law provided for a continuation of the Torato Umanuto arrangement under specific conditions laid down in the law; it was hoped that the number of exemptions would gradually reduce. The new law did not however put an end to controversies and disagreements.

In 2005, then Justice Minister Tzipi Livni stated that the Tal Law, which by then had yet to be fully implemented, did not provide an adequate solution of the problem of Haredi conscription as only 1,115 of the 41,450 yeshiva students covered by the arrangement had taken the "decision year" provided by the law, and of these only 31 had later enlisted in the Israel Defense Forces. In 2007 the Tal Law was extended until August 2012. In January 2012, Defense Minister Ehud Barak said his ministry was preparing an alternative to the Tal Law. Dozens of IDF reserve soldiers had put up what they called "the suckers' camp" near the Tel Aviv Savidor Central Railway Station, to protest the possible extension of the Tal Law. Several politicians, public figures, disabled IDF veterans and high school and university students visited the protest encampment.

In February 2012 the High Court of Justice (a role of the Supreme Court of Israel) ruled that the Tal Law in its current form was unconstitutional and could not be extended beyond August. Prime minister Benjamin Netanyahu said that the government would formulate a new bill that would guarantee a more equal sharing of the burden by all parts of Israeli society. The issue was also part of a possible government collapse leading into the 2012-2013 election.

See also
 A Jewish and Democratic State
 Hardal
 Haredim and Zionism
 Hesder - a Religious Zionist ("National Religious") yeshiva framework devoped by Rav Yehuda Amital, combining Torah study and military service
 Nahal Haredi - the IDF's Netzah Yehuda Battalion, which facilitates Haredi service in combat roles
 Religion in Israel
 Status quo (Israel)

References 

Haredi Judaism in Israel
Law of Israel
Religion in Israel
Religion in the Israel Defense Forces
Talmud concepts and terminology
Conscription in Israel
Haredi anti-Zionism